Royal Institute of Public Health merged in 2008 with the Royal Society for Health to form Royal Society for Public Health (RSPH).

History 
The institute was the amalgamation of a few societies. The Metropolitan Association of Medical Officers of Health was an English society of metropolitan Medical Officer for Health established on 3 April 1856. In 1869 "Metropolitan" was dropped from the title, and in 1873 it became the Society of Medical Officers of Health, and in 1989 it became the Society of Public Health.

Timeline

Presidents 
Past presidents include:
 John Simon, first president
 Lawson Soulsby, Baron Soulsby of Swaffham Prior
Nora Wattie

Publications 
 Public Health (journal), now owned by Royal Society for Public Health.

Previous publications 
 Journal of State Medicine
 Health & Hygiene

References

External links 
 Data for Societies Founded from 1850 to 1859
 Archives of the Royal Institute of Public Health and Hygiene at the Wellcome Library
Royal Society for Public Health

Food safety in the United Kingdom
Food safety organizations
Medical and health organisations based in the United Kingdom
Public health in the United Kingdom